The 2021 California Vulcans football team represented California University of Pennsylvania as a member of the West Division of the Pennsylvania State Athletic Conference (PSAC) during the 2021 NCAA Division II football season. Led by sixth-year head coach Gary Dunn, California compiled an overall record of 9–1 with a mark of 5–1 in conference play, sharing PSAC West Division title with Slippery Rock, who dealt the Vulcans their only loss of the season. By virtue of the head-to-head win Slippery Rock earned a berth in the PSAC Football Championship Game. California was ranked No. 21 in the final AFCA poll, but was not selected for the NCAA Division II Football Championship playoffs. The Vulcans played their home games at Hepner–Bailey Field at Adamson Stadium in California, Pennsylvania.

Due the COVID-19 pandemic, all PSAC teams cancelled play in 2020.

Schedule

References

California
California Vulcans football seasons
California Vulcans football